{{DISPLAYTITLE:Histamine H3 receptor}}

Histamine H3 receptors are expressed in the central nervous system and to a lesser extent the peripheral nervous system, where they act as autoreceptors in presynaptic histaminergic neurons and control histamine turnover by feedback inhibition of histamine synthesis and release. The H3 receptor has also been shown to presynaptically inhibit the release of a number of other neurotransmitters (i.e. it acts as an inhibitory heteroreceptor) including, but probably not limited to dopamine, GABA, acetylcholine, noradrenaline, histamine and serotonin.

The gene sequence for H3 receptors expresses only about 22% and 20% homology with both H1 and H2 receptors respectively.

There is much interest in the histamine H3 receptor as a potential therapeutic target because of its involvement in the neuronal mechanism behind many cognitive disorders and especially its location in the central nervous system.

Tissue distribution

 Central nervous system
 Peripheral nervous system
 Heart
 Lungs
 Gastrointestinal tract
 Endothelial cells

Function 
Like all histamine receptors, the H3 receptor is a G-protein coupled receptor. The H3 receptor is coupled to the Gi G-protein, so it leads to inhibition of the formation of cAMP. Also, the β and γ subunits interact with N-type voltage gated calcium channels, to reduce action potential mediated influx of calcium and hence reduce neurotransmitter release.
H3 receptors function as presynaptic autoreceptors on histamine-containing neurons.

The diverse expression of H3 receptors throughout the cortex and subcortex indicates its ability to modulate the release of a large number of neurotransmitters.

H3 receptors are thought to play a part in the control of satiety.

Isoforms
There are at least six H3 receptor isoforms in the human, and more than 20 discovered so far. In rats there have been six H3receptor subtypes identified so far. Mice also have three reported isoforms. These subtypes all have subtle difference in their pharmacology (and presumably distribution, based on studies in rats) but the exact physiological role of these isoforms is still unclear.

Pharmacology

Agonists
There are currently no therapeutic products acting as selective agonists for H3 receptors, although there are several compounds used as research tools which are reasonably selective agonists. Some examples are:

(R)-α-methylhistamine
Cipralisant (initially assessed as H3 antagonist, later found to be an agonist, shows functional selectivity, activating some G-protein coupled pathways but not others)
Imbutamine (also H4 agonist)
Immepip
Imetit
Immethridine
Methimepip
Proxyfan (complex functional selectivity; partial agonist effects on cAMP inhibition and MAPK activity, antagonist on histamine release, and inverse agonist on arachidonic acid release)

Antagonists
These include:
A-304121 (No tolerance formation, silent antagonist)
A-349,821
ABT-239
Betahistine (also weak H1 agonist)
Burimamide (also weak H2 antagonist)
Ciproxifan
Clobenpropit (also H4 antagonist)
Conessine
Failproxifan (No tolerance formation)
Impentamine
Iodophenpropit
Irdabisant
Pitolisant
Thioperamide (also H4 antagonist)
VUF-5681 (4-[3-(1H-Imidazol-4-yl)propyl]piperidine)

Therapeutic potential
The H3-receptor is a promising potential therapeutical target for many (cognitive) disorders that are caused by a histaminergic H3R dysfunction, because it is linked to the central nervous system and its regulation of other neurotransmitters. Examples of such disorders are: sleep disorders (including narcolepsy), Tourette syndrome, Parkinson, OCD, ADHD, ASS and drug addictions.

This receptor has been proposed as a target for treating sleep disorders. The receptor has also been proposed as a target for treating neuropathic pain.

Because of its ability to modulate other neurotransmitters, H3 receptor ligands are being investigated for the treatment of numerous neurological conditions, including obesity (because of the histamine/orexinergic system interaction), movement disorders (because of H3 receptor-modulation of dopamine and GABA in the basal ganglia), schizophrenia and ADHD (again because of dopamine modulation) and research is underway to determine whether H3 receptor ligands could be useful in modulating wakefulness (because of effects on noradrenaline, glutamate and histamine).

There is also evidence that the H3-receptor plays an important role in Tourette syndrome. Mouse-models and other research demonstrated that reducing histamine concentration in the H3R causes tics, but adding histamine in the striatum decreases the symptoms. The interaction between histamine (H3-receptor) and dopamine as well as other neurotransmitters is an important underlying mechanism behind the disorder.

History
 1983 The H3 receptor is pharmacologically identified.
 1988 H3 receptor found to mediate inhibition of serotonin release in rat brain cortex.
 1997 H3 receptors shown to modulate ischemic norepinephrine release in animals.
 1999 H3 receptor cloned
 2000 H3 receptors called "new frontier in myocardial ischemia"
 2002 H3(-/-) mice (mice that do not have this receptor)

See also 
 Antihistamine – histamine receptor antagonists
 H3-receptor antagonist
 Histamine H1-receptor
 Histamine H2-receptor
 Histamine H4-receptor

References

Further reading

External links 
 

Histamine receptors